Piraeus B is a Greek election constituency that includes the Piraeus regional unit municipalities and Salamina. Concretely, this constituency includes the municipalities of Keratsini-Drapetsona, Nikaia-Agios Ioannis Rentis, Korydallos, Perama and Salamina. It was created for 1974 Greek parliament elections and currently elects 8 members of parliament. It is one of five electoral constituencies of the Attica region and former prefecture, along with Piraeus A, Athens A and Athens B, and Remainder of Attica. It was established in 1958, primarily to separate the heavily left-voting suburbs of Piraeus from the municipality of Piraeus and diminish the electoral power of the United Democratic Left.

Election results

Legislative election

Members of Parliament

Current members
Eirini Kasimati  (SYRIZA)
Evaggelia Karakosta  (SYRIZA)
Dimitrios Vitsas  (SYRIZA)
Ioannis Tragakis (ND)
Diamanto Manolakou (KKE)
Ioannis Lagos (XA)
Panagiotis Kammenos (ANEL)
Theodora Megaloikonomou (INDEPENDENT)

Members (Jan 2015- Sep 2015)
The members of parliament after the January 2015 election are considered below. The most votes for The River were for party chairman Stavros Theodorakis, but he chose the seat of Chania, so the seat of Piraeus B passed to Nikos Orfanos.

Panagiotis Lafazanis (SYRIZA)
Eirini Kasimati  (SYRIZA)
Evaggelia Karakosta  (SYRIZA)
Ioannis Tragakis (ND)
Diamanto Manolakou (KKE)
Ioannis Lagos (XA)
Dimitris Kammenos (ANEL)
Nikos Orfanos (The River)

Notes and references

Parliamentary constituencies of Greece
1958 establishments in Greece
Constituencies established in 1958
Piraeus